The 2009 All-Ireland Minor Football Championship was the 78th staging of the All-Ireland Minor Football Championship, the Gaelic Athletic Association's premier inter-county Gaelic football tournament for boys under the age of 18.

Tyrone entered the championship as defending champions, however, they were defeated by Armagh in the Ulster quarter-final.

On 20 September 2009, Armagh won the championship following a 0-10 to 0-7 defeat of Mayo in the All-Ireland final. This was their second All-Ireland title overall and their first in sixty championship seasons.

Results

Connacht Minor Football Championship

Quarter-final

Semi-finals

Finals

Leinster Minor Football Championship

First round

Second round

Third round

Quarter-finals

Semi-finals

Finals

Munster Minor Football Championship

Quarter-finals

Play-offs

Semi-finals

Final

Ulster Minor Football Championship

Preliminary round

Quarter-finals

Semi-finals

Final

All-Ireland Minor Football Championship

Quarter-finals

Semi-finals

Final

References

2009
All-Ireland Minor Football Championship